Melanesia 2000 was the first festival of Melanesian arts, first held in Noumea, New Caledonia in September 1975, supported by Jean-Marie Tjibaou. It had its origins in the women's association, Smiling Melanesian Village Women's Groups which was formed in 1971 and advocated the idea of a cultural festival to promote Kanak arts.

References

External links
Recording of Melanesian 2000

New Caledonian culture
1975 in Oceania
1975 in New Caledonia